Bakbakan is a boxing television program on ABS-CBN. The series premiered on June 15, 2008 and ended on May 31, 2009, replacing Gaby's Xtraordinary Files. It features boxers, sports analysts and profiles from the past. The program is hosted by Dyan Castillejo.

See also
 List of programs broadcast by ABS-CBN

Philippine sports television series
ABS-CBN original programming
2008 Philippine television series debuts
2009 Philippine television series endings
Filipino-language television shows